Taichirō, Taichiro or Taichirou (written: 太一郎) is a masculine Japanese given name. Notable people with the name include:

, Japanese voice actor
, Japanese volleyball player
Taichiro Morinaga (1865–1937), Japanese businessman

Japanese masculine given names